The following are lists of fictional hybrid characters:

 List of fictional cyborgs
 List of dhampirs - (Half vampires)
 List of werewolves
 List of avian humanoids
 List of hybrid creatures in mythology
 List of piscine and amphibian humanoids
 List of reptilian humanoids
 List of winged unicorns

See also
 List of genetic hybrids

Lists of fictional characters
Lists of fictional life forms